The 2019 North Somerset Council election took place on 2 May 2019 to elect members of North Somerset Council in England.

North Somerset unitary council is elected every four years, with fifty councillors to be elected. Since the first election to the unitary authority in 1995, the council has either been under Conservative party control, or no party has held a majority. The Conservatives gained a majority at the 2007 election and retained control for 12 years. Following these elections, a "rainbow coalition" of Independents, Liberal Democrats, Labour and Green councillors replaced the previous Conservative administration.

Overall Results 

|}

Background 
North Somerset Council held local elections on 2 May 2019 along with councils across England as part of the 2019 local elections. The council elects its members in all-out elections, with all fifty of its councillors up for election every four years. Councillors defending their seats in this election were previously elected in 2015. In that election, thirty-six Conservative councillors, six independent councillors, four Liberal Democrat councillors, three Labour councillors and one Green councillor were elected. In subsequent by-elections, Labour gained one seat from the Conservatives.

In the build up to the 2019 election, ten incumbent councillors made up of eight Conservative councillors, one Liberal Democrat councillor and the sole Green councillor announced they would not be seeking re-election. Additionally, a group of independent councillors representing the town of Portishead received approval from the Electoral Commission to be listed as "Portishead Independents" on ballots, and the group listed candidates in three of the four wards in their town.

Ward results
The ward results listed below are based on the changes from the 2015 elections, not taking into account any party defections or by-elections. Sitting councillors are marked with an asterisk (*).

Backwell

Incumbent Karen Barclay (Conservative) did not run.

Banwell & Winscombe

Blagdon & Churchill

  

Incumbent Liz Wells (Conservative) did not run.

Clevedon East

Clevedon South

Clevedon Walton

Incumbent Colin Hall (Conservative) did not run.

Clevedon West

Clevedon Yeo

Incumbent Ericka Blades (Conservative) did not run.

Congresbury & Puxton

Incumbent Tom Leimdorfer (Green) did not run.

Gordano Valley

Hutton & Locking

Long Ashton

Nailsea Golden Valley

Nailsea West End

Nailsea Yeo

Nailsea Youngwood

Pill

Portishead East

Portishead North

Portishead South

Portishead West

Weston-super-Mare Central

Weston-super-Mare Hillside

Weston-super-Mare Kewstoke

Weston-super-Mare Mid Worle

Incumbent Robert Cleland (Conservative) ran in Weston-super-Mare South instead.

Weston-super-Mare Milton

Incumbent Martin Williams (Conservative) did not run.

Weston-super-Mare North Worle

Incumbent Denise Hunt had previously gained the seat for Labour from North Somerset First Independents following a by-election in 2017.

Weston-super-Mare South

Ward previously known as Weston-super-Mare Bournville.

Weston-super-Mare South Worle

Weston-super-Mare Uphill

Weston-super-Mare Winterstoke

Incumbent Dawn Payne (Conservative) did not run.

Wick St Lawrence & St Georges

Winford

Incumbent Nick Wilton (Conservative) did not run.

Wrington

Incumbent Deborah Yamanaka (Liberal Democrat) did not run.

Yatton

Incumbent Judith Hadley (Conservative) did not run.

By-elections

Portishead East

Congresbury & Puxton

A by-election was called due to the resignation of the incumbent Liberal Democrat councillors.

References
General

Specific

2019 English local elections
May 2019 events in the United Kingdom
2019
2010s in Somerset